Love Lies is a studio album by American Christian and country music artist Cristy Lane. It was released in December 1978 via LS Records and contained 12 tracks. The album was the third released in Lane's music career and contained two singles. Its second single release, "I Just Can't Stay Married to You," became a top five country hit in both the United States and Canada. Love Lies received positive reviews from music critics and publications.

Background and content
After establishing his own record label, Lee Stoller began exclusively recording his wife (Cristy Lane) for his newly formed LS Records. Lane began recording music for the country market through the label. In 1977, she had her first hit with "Let Me Down Easy". Earlier in 1978, she released her first album with LS, which included "Let Me Down Easy". With her new success, Lane returned to the recording studio in October 1978 with producer Charlie Black to cut nine tracks that would help comprise Love Lies. A total of 12 tracks were included on the album. Three additional songs were cut as early as March 1977, including the single "Sweet Deceiver". Included on Love Lies was a cover of the pop hit "My Heart Cries for You". It also featured three original tracks co-written by Charlie Black, including the future single "I Just Can't Stay Married to You". Lee Stoller also penned a track for the album titled "Somebody's Baby".

Release and reception

Love Lies was released in December 1978 via LS Records. It was Lane's second studio release for LS and the third album release of her career. The album was distributed as a vinyl LP, containing six tracks on either side of the record. Love Lies would be her first LP to chart on the Billboard country albums survey, peaking at number 44. The album was featured on the first page of Billboard magazine in March 1979. The publication commented that the LP "contains 12 great songs" and also highlighted her multiple hit singles up to that point. Greg Adams of AllMusic also gave Love Lies a positive response in his review, rating the album at four stars. He called the album's sound to be "bright" and "chippy", while describing Lane's voice with a "girl-next-door" vocal delivery. "Fans of Lane's early country recordings will agree that Love Lies ranks among her best efforts," Adams concluded.

Love Lies contained two songs that were first released as a singles. In May 1977, the track "Sweet Deceiver" was first released as a single via LS Records. It became her second single to reach the Billboard Hot Country Songs chart, peaking at number 53 in 1977. In November 1978, "I Just Can't Stay Married to You" was released as a single also on the LS label. Spending multiple weeks on the Billboard country singles chart, the song peaked at number five in 1979, becoming Lane's highest-charting single up to that point. On Canada's RPM Country Singles survey, the single would reach number four, becoming her second top ten hit in Canada.

Track listing

Personnel
All credits are adapted from the liner notes of Love Lies.

Musical personnel

 Charlie Black – Background vocals, guitar
 Harold Bradley – Guitar, mandolin
 Susie Callaway – Background vocals
 Jerry Carrigan – Drums
 Johnny Christopher – Guitar
 Rita Figlio – Background vocals
 Don Gant – Background vocals
 Gregg Galbraith – Guitar
 Sonny Garrish – Steel guitar
 Randy Goodrum – Piano
 Jon Goin – Guitar
 The Leah Jane Singers – Background vocals
 Sherri Kramer – Background vocals
 The Shelly Kurland Strings – Strings
 Cristy Lane – Lead vocals
 Mike Lawler – Synthesizer
 Larry Londin – Drums
 Craig Mirijanian – Drums

 Bob Moore – Bass
 Weldon Myrick – Steel guitar
 Fred Newell – Guitar
 Ron Oates – Piano
 Joe Osborn – Bass
 Steve Schaeffer – Bass
 Lisa Silver – Background vocals
 Diane Tidwell – Background vocals
 Chip Young – Guitar

Technical personnel 
 Charlie Black – Producer
 Herb Burnette – Photography
 Glenn Meadows – Mastering
 Farrell Morris – Percussion
 Steve Moser – Engineering and recording
 Lee Stoller – Manager
 Bergen White – String arrangement

Charts

Release history

References

1978 albums
Albums produced by Charlie Black
Cristy Lane albums
LS Records albums